The 2002 Wyoming gubernatorial election was held on November 5, 2002. Incumbent Republican Governor Jim Geringer was term-limited and unable to seek a third term in office, thereby creating an open seat. Former U.S. Attorney Dave Freudenthal and former Wyoming House Speaker Eli Bebout both emerged from competitive Democratic and Republican primaries, respectively, and faced off against each other in the general election. Despite Wyoming's strong inclination to elect Republicans, a contentious race ensued, with Freudenthal ultimately defeating Bebout by fewer than 4,000 votes.

Democratic primary

Candidates
Ken Casner
Dave Freudenthal, former United States Attorney for the District of Wyoming
Paul Hickey, attorney, former Chairman of the Wyoming Pipeline Authority and son of former Governor John J. Hickey
Toby Simpson, construction worker

Results

Republican primary

Candidates
Eli Bebout, former Speaker of the Wyoming House of Representatives
Ray Hunkins, attorney and rancher
John H. Self
Bill Sniffin, journalist and former Wyoming Travel Commissioner
Stephen Watt, State Representative

Results

General election

Predictions

Results

References

2002
Wyoming
Gubernatorial